The barred loach (Nemacheilus fasciatus) is a species of ray-finned fish in the genus Nemacheilus.

Size
The maximum length of an unsexed male is 7.4 centimeters.

Location
The barred loach can be found in fresh water in tropical climates in areas such as Sumatra and Java in Indonesia. It is found in mountain streams, and it prefers quiet and clear water.

Feeding
The barred loach feeds on benthic organisms and detritus.

References

Footnotes 
 

F
Fish described in 1846